Willie Anne Wright (born June 6, 1924) is an American photographer known for her colorful cibachrome and grayscale Pinhole Photography.

Biography
Willie Anne Wright was born Willie Anna Boschen, in Richmond, Virginia. Her father was a musician and sometime-artist.

She graduated from the College of William & Mary in 1945 with a BS in Psychology, and from Virginia Commonwealth University in 1964 with an MFA in Painting. She later studied at the Maine photographic workshops in Rockport, Maine and the Visual Studies Workshop in Rochester, New York.

She married and had three children.

Career 
Willie Anne began her artistic career as a painter, teaching art classes at the Jewish Community Center, and was influenced by one of her painting instructors, Theresa Pollak. For a while, she experimented with printmaking. By 1973, she began to focus more and more on photography. Inspired by her surroundings and personal life, her first works incorporated images of her family, friends, and Civil War reenactors. Well known for her use of the old technique of pinhole, she is also an exceptional master in lensless photography, solar printing, and photograms.

Some of her more well known works include her "Civil War Redux" series, which focuses on local Civil War reenactors whom she followed around for several years, her "Pregnant Women" series, which features pregnant friends of hers, and "The Swimmer" series, which features women lounging by poolsides or in pools.

Technique 
Willie Anne first experimented with pinhole photography in 1985. For a class project she had to create and use a pinhole camera. She used Cibachrome paper for use in a sixteen by twenty inch pinhole camera. With color-correcting filters she created wide-angle color prints by placing the pinhole close to the film plane. Her images were whimsical with bright colors and a vignette border.

Collections
Wright's work is held in the following public collections:
Virginia Museum of Fine Arts.
Chrysler Museum of Art.
Mary Baldwin University
Walter Cecil Rawls Library and Museum, Courtland, VA
Mariners' Museum.
Southeast Museum of Photography
Smithsonian American Art Museum
New Orleans Museum of Art.
Longwood University.
University of Maine.
University of New Hampshire.

Exhibitions
 1958 Group show, Valentine Museum, Richmond, VA
 1960 Group show, Valentine Museum, Richmond, VA
 1962 Group show, Valentine Museum, Richmond, VA
 1962 Group show, Motorola Regional
 1963 Group show, Virginia Museum of Fine Arts, Richmond, VA
 1964 Solo show, Jewish Community Center, Richmond, VA
 1965 Solo show, The Art Market, Richmond, VA
 1965 Group show, 20th Century Gallery, Williamsburg, VA
 1966 Solo show, Westhampton College, Richmond, VA
 1966 Solo show, University Theatre, Charlottesville, VA
 1967 Solo show, Virginia Museum of Fine Arts, Richmond, VA
 1967 Group show, 20th Century Gallery, Williamsburg, VA
 1968 Group show, Christopher Newport College, Newport News, VA
 1970 Group show, "American Painting", Virginia Museum of Fine Arts, Richmond, VA 
 1971 Group show, Virginia Museum of Fine Arts, Richmond, VA
 1973 Group show, "Virginia Photographers", Virginia Museum of Fine Arts, Richmond, VA
 1974 Group show, "Works on Paper by Women", Washington Gallery, Washington, D.C.
 1974 Solo show, Southeastern Center for Contemporary Art, Winston-Salem, NC
 1975 Solo show, Columbia Museum of Art, Columbia, SC
 1975 Group show, "Virginia Photographers" Virginia Museum of Fine Arts, Richmond, VA
 1975 Solo show, Foundry Gallery, Washington, D.C.
 1976 Solo show, Virginia Beach Arts Center, Virginia Beach, VA
 1976 Solo show, Deja Vu Gallery of Photographic Art, Toronto, Canada
 1985 Group show, "The Postcard Art Project", 1708 East Main Gallery, Richmond, VA
 2015 Solo show, "Direct Positive", Candela Books, Richmond, VA.

Awards 
 1964 Best in Show & Purchase Award, Thalheimers Invitational, Richmond, VA
 1967 Purchase Award, "Virginia Artists" biennial, Virginia Museum of Fine Arts, Richmond, VA
 1970 Second prize, Thalheimers Invitational, Richmond, VA
 1970 First prize, Richmond Artists Exhibition, Richmond, VA
 1974 Purchase Award, James River Juried Show, Chrysler Museum, Norfolk, VA

References

External links
 
 Civil War Redux: Pinhole Photographs of Re-enactments, by Willie Anne Wright | Ester Knows All Things VCUarts
 Summary of the Willie Ann Wright photographs, 1983 | Archives of American Art, Smithsonian Institution

1924 births
Living people
20th-century American photographers
College of William & Mary alumni
Virginia Commonwealth University alumni
21st-century American photographers
Artists from Richmond, Virginia
Photographers from Virginia
Visual Studies Workshop alumni
20th-century American women photographers
21st-century American women photographers